Ronald James Alexander  (born 10 December 1950) is a former Australian rules footballer who played for the Fitzroy Football Club in the Victorian Football League (VFL) and for the East Perth Football Club and East Fremantle Football Club in the West Australian Football League (WAFL). He served as captain-coach of East Fremantle and was also the inaugural senior coach of the West Coast Eagles.

Playing career
During his career he represented Western Australia 13 times, Victoria twice, and was awarded a Simpson Medal for a match against Victoria in 1974.

WANFL career
He began his career with East Perth Football Club where from 1971 to 1975 he played 98 games and kicked 49 goals. He was a big, strong muscular ruckman, weighing 115 kg and standing at 198 cm tall.

He was a member of their 1972 premiership team and won the club's fairest and best award in 1974.

VFL career
He then crossed over to Fitzroy in 1976. He was their captain from 1979–80, and in 1981 won their best and fairest, finishing ahead of that season's Brownlow Medallist Bernie Quinlan by nine votes. In total he played 133 games and booted 30 goals for the Roys. While in Melbourne he gained a degree in Physical Education and for a time was president of the VFL Players Association. He went back to Perth after the 1981 season.

Coaching career
He returned to Western Australia in 1982 and took on the role of captain/coach at East Fremantle taking them to the grand final in 1984, 1985 and 1986, winning the 1985 Premiership.

In 1986, after 76 games for East Fremantle, he stepped down as a player, but as coach he once again took his side the grand final and like 1984 they were again runners-up.

West Coast Eagles
In 1987, he was picked to be the inaugural senior coach of the West Coast Eagles. 

He was controversially sacked and replaced by John Todd at the end of the 1987 season, despite 11 wins and being close to taking his side to the finals in their first year.

After football
From 1999 to 2017, he was   the Director-General of the Western Australian Department of Sport and Recreation.   (DSR). Over the decade commencing from 2000 the DSR achieved recognition and success with multiple Premier Awards and in 2016 received a Commendation from the Western Australian Public Sector Commissioner for outstanding results in climate and culture surveys. DSR was also named on occasion in the WA Auditor Generals annual reports as a better practice agency. In 2017 the WA Government decided to merge the Department with the Departments of Local Government, Culture and Arts, Racing Gaming and Liquor, some services from the Department of Aboriginal Affairs and Office of Muliticultural Interests.
In the Queen's Birthday 2019 Honours List, Alexander was made a Member of the Order of Australia "for significant service to sport and recreation, and to public administration."

In October 2021, Alexander was elected to the North Ward of the City of Vincent.

References

External links

Profile at WA Football Hall of Fame

1950 births
Living people
Australian rules footballers from Western Australia
East Perth Football Club players
East Fremantle Football Club players
Fitzroy Football Club players
West Coast Eagles coaches
East Fremantle Football Club coaches
Mitchell Medal winners
Western Australian State of Origin players
All-Australian coaches
West Australian Football Hall of Fame inductees
Western Australian local councillors